Christopher Eberts is a Canadian film and television producer. His films include Lucky Number Slevin and Lord of War.

Early life
Raised in Montreal, Quebec, Canada, Eberts attended McGill University and graduated with a BA in English, Film and Communications.

Prior to working in the film and television business, he worked for four years in the Merchant Banking Division of Salomon Brothers, in New York City.

His uncle is producer Jake Eberts.

Christopher Eberts is married to Kristin Tutor-Eberts and has two children.

Film production
His works include Lucky Number Slevin starring Josh Hartnett, Bruce Willis, Lucy Liu, Morgan Freeman and Sir Ben Kingsley, directed by Paul McGuigan; Lord of War starring Nicolas Cage and Ethan Hawke, directed by Andrew Niccol; The Big White starring Robin Williams, Holly Hunter and Woody Harrelson, directed by Mark Mylod; Ask the Dust starring Colin Farrell and Salma Hayek, written and directed by Robert Towne; Edison starring Kevin Spacey, Morgan Freeman, Justin Timberlake, and LL Cool J; The Jacket starring Adrien Brody and Keira Knightley, directed by John Maybury; The Punisher starring John Travolta and Thomas Jane, directed by Jonathan Hensleigh; Deception starring Ewan McGregor, Hugh Jackman, and Michelle Williams, directed by Marcel Langenegger; Who's Your Caddy? starring Big Boi and Faizon Love; Timber Falls starring Josh Randall and Brianna Brown, directed by Tony Giglio; Already Dead starring Til Schweiger and Christopher Plummer, directed by Joe Otting; Half Past Dead starring Steven Seagal and Ja Rule; The Watcher, starring Keanu Reeves, James Spader, Marisa Tomei and Chris Ellis; Chasing Holden starring DJ Qualls and Rachel Blanchard; and Woman Wanted starring Kiefer Sutherland and Holly Hunter. Eberts also executive produced the documentary film, Prisoner of Paradise, which was nominated for a 2002 Academy Award for Best Documentary.

Before forming his own production banner "Orum Road Entertainment", Eberts was Vice President of Production at Twentieth Century Fox where he was responsible for all phases of feature film development and production, including:  solicitation of screenplays and other source material; screenplay analysis and development; assignment of director, cast and other creative elements; the securing of production financing and distribution arrangements; as well as the physical supervision of all aspects of the production process.

In 2007 he formed production company Rifkin-Eberts with agent Arnold Rifkin.

In 2013, Eberts was indicted by a grand jury in Illinois on seven counts of wire fraud and three counts of money laundering; upon pleading guilty, he was sentenced to nearly four years in prison.  Two years later, the court's decision was affirmed after Eberts appealed.

Filmography
He was a producer in all films unless otherwise noted.

Film

References

http://www.hollywoodreporter.com/thr-esq/indie-producer-christopher-eberts-pleads-786364

External links
 

 http://www.latimes.com/entertainment/envelope/cotown/la-et-ct-lord-of-war-producer-christopher-eberts-sentenced-20150714-story.html

Film producers from Quebec
Living people
Place of birth missing (living people)
Year of birth missing (living people)